Shang Chuan ( November 1945 – 26 December 2017) was a Chinese historian of Ming dynasty.

Born in 1945, Shang graduated in History from then Beijing Normal College. In 1981, he earned his Master's degree from the Institute of History, Chinese Academy of Social Sciences, under Xie Guozhen's guidance. He concentrated on researching ancient politicians and ritual systems in his early days, but turned attention to the social and cultural history later. He was the president of the Chinese Society on Ming Dynasty History (2010-17) and a research fellow from the Institute of Archaeology, CASS.

Shang died in Beijing, on 26 December 2017, aged 72. His father, Hongkui, was also a well-known historian, whose speciality was the history of the Qing dynasty.

References 

1945 births
2017 deaths
Writers from Baoding
Historians from Hebei
Capital Normal University alumni
People's Republic of China historians